Bonne Nouvelle is a station on Line 8 and Line 9 of the Paris Métro. The section of both lines from just east of Richelieu – Drouot to west of République was built under the Grand Boulevards, which replaced the Louis XIII wall and is in soft ground, which was once the course of the Seine. The lines are built on two levels, with line 8 on the higher level and line 9 in the lower level. The platforms are at the sides and the box containing the lines and supporting the road above is strengthened by a central wall between the tracks. There is no interconnection between the lines at Bonne Nouvelle, with each level having different accesses to the street; however, passengers may pass between levels in order to make connections.

History
The station was opened on 5 May 1931 with the extension of Line 8 from Richelieu – Drouot to Porte de Charenton. The Line 9 platforms were opened on 10 December 1933 with the extension of the line from Richelieu – Drouot to Porte de Montreuil.

Name
The station is named after the district of Bonne-Nouvelle and Boulevard de Bonne-Nouvelle, both named after the church of Notre-Dame de Bonne-Nouvelle.

Nearby attractions
Nearby are the church of Notre-Dame de Bonne-Nouvelle, the Conservatoire national supérieur d'art dramatique (national dramatic art school), the Grand Rex theatre and the Théâtre du Gymnase Marie Bell.

In tribute to the area's contribution to the theatrical and cinematic arts, the signage for the Bonne Nouvelle station is done up in a fashion similar to the Hollywood sign.

Station layout

Gallery

References
Roland, Gérard (2003). Stations de métro. D’Abbesses à Wagram. Éditions Bonneton.

Paris Métro stations in the 2nd arrondissement of Paris
Paris Métro stations in the 9th arrondissement of Paris
Paris Métro stations in the 10th arrondissement of Paris
Railway stations in France opened in 1931